The women's giant slalom competition of the PyeongChang 2018 Olympics was held on 15 February 2018 at the Yongpyong Alpine Centre at the Alpensia Sports Park in PyeongChang. Originally set to be held on 12 February 2018, winds in excess of 50 km/h forced officials to reschedule the race for 15 February 2018.

In the victory ceremony, the medals were presented by Princess Nora of Liechtenstein, member of the International Olympic Committee, accompanied by Dexter Paine, FIS Vice President.

Qualification

A total of up to 320 alpine skiers qualified across all eleven events. Athletes qualified for this event by having met the A qualification standard, which meant having 140 or less FIS Points and being ranked in the top 500 in the Olympic FIS points list or meeting the B standard, which meant 140 or less FIS points. Countries not meeting the A standard were allowed to enter a maximum of one B standard athlete per gender. 

The Points list takes into average the best results of athletes per discipline during the qualification period (July 1, 2016 to January 21, 2018). Countries received additional quotas by having athletes ranked in the top 30 of the 2017–18 FIS Alpine Ski World Cup (two per gender maximum, overall across all events). After the distribution of B standard quotas (to nations competing only in the slalom and giant slalom events), the remaining quotas were distributed using the Olympic FIS Points list, with each athlete only counting once for qualification purposes. A country could only enter a maximum of four athletes for the event.

Results
The race was started at 10:00 (Run 1) and 13:45 (Run 2).

References

Women's alpine skiing at the 2018 Winter Olympics